Jackie Goss (born 1967 in Snowville, New Hampshire) is an American media artist, utilising videos and web-based projects, often featuring Flash animation techniques. Goss graduated from Brown University and received an M.F.A from Rensselaer Polytechnic Institute.  She teaches at Bard College in New York.

Her work has shown in the New York Film Festival, London Film Festival, Rotterdam Film Festival, and Wexner Center for the Arts among other venues. She has received awards from the Tribeca Film Institute, Creative Capital Foundation, the Rockefeller Foundation, the Herb Alpert Foundation, and the Berliner Kunstlerprogramm. Her videos are distributed by Video Data Bank in Chicago.

Filmography
2007 - Stranger Comes to Town

References

American artists
Brown University alumni
Rensselaer Polytechnic Institute alumni
Bard College faculty
1967 births
Living people
People from Carroll County, New Hampshire